The STRIM 65 is an anti-tank rifle grenade that the French Army used from 1961 to 1978, under the designation 65 AC 28. This and the older 73mm Modèle 1950 (similar in appearance to an Energa grenade) were the standard anti-tank munitions in French service. A 22 mm grenade launching adapter mounted atop the rifle's barrel held the grenade until the firing of a ballistite (blank) cartridge provided the propulsive force to launch the grenade.

Mecar, under licence, also made the grenade in Belgium, and a licence was also granted to Armscor of South Africa.

The AC58 rifle grenade manufactured by Luchaire replaced the STRIM 65. The AC58 used a new bullet trap form of propulsion, thereby doing away with the need for a special launching round.

The Brazilian M2 anti-personnel and M3 anti-tank rifle grenades bear a strong similarity to the STRIM 40 and STRIM 65 respectively.

Sources and references

External links
French army manual on rifle grenades dated 1966 with an illustration of the STRIM 65 (65 AC 28) and text on pages 26 to 28
Images of a practice round as used by the SADF up to the 1980s
Recollection of firing a STRIM during basic training in 1979 at Walvis Bay
Article (in Spanish) with reference to several French and Brazilian rifle grenades

Cold War weapons of France
Rifle grenades
Anti-tank grenades
Military equipment introduced in the 1970s